Planet Moon Studios was a game development studio based in San Francisco, California founded by ex-Shiny Entertainment developers Nick Bruty (President) and Bob Stevenson (CEO) in 1997. The founding members were then known as the team behind the hit game MDK.

Shortly after its founding, the developer signed a multi-game deal with publisher Interplay Entertainment, despite the fact that it had yet to announce its first game or even decide on a name for the company.

Planet Moon developed the games Giants: Citizen Kabuto (Interplay, 2000) and Armed and Dangerous (LucasArts, 2003)  The games are critically well received and are often lauded for their humor in various reviews.

In January 2011, Bigpoint Games acquired the Planet Moon Studios staff in San Francisco, California, but did not acquire the company, its intellectual properties, or its other assets. Shortly thereafter, Planet Moon Studios closed its doors.

Games 
 2000: Giants: Citizen Kabuto (Windows/PS2)
 2003: Armed and Dangerous (Windows/Xbox)
 2005: Infected (PSP)
 2007: After Burner: Black Falcon (PSP)
 2007: Smarty Pants (Wii)
 2008: Battle of the Bands (Wii)
 2008: Booty Blocks (iPhone/iPod Touch)
 2008: Brain Quest Grades 3 & 4 (DS)
 2008: Brain Quest Grades 5 & 6 (DS)
 2009: Drawn to Life: The Next Chapter (Wii)
 2010: Tangled: The Video Game (DS/Wii)

References

External links
 Official website via Internet Archive
 Planet Moon Studios profile on MobyGames

Defunct video game companies of the United States
American companies established in 1997
Video game companies established in 1997
Video game companies disestablished in 2011
Video game development companies
Defunct companies based in the San Francisco Bay Area
Companies based in San Francisco
1997 establishments in California
2011 disestablishments in California